Samuel Munson (1804 in New Sharon, Maine – 28 June 1834 in Sacca, Lopu Pining, Tapanuli, Sumatra) was an American Baptist missionary who, together with his colleague Henry Lyman, was murdered and cannibalised in Sumatra.

References

1804 births
1834 deaths
Baptist missionaries in Indonesia
Baptist missionaries from the United States
Cannibalised people
People from New Sharon, Maine
People murdered in Indonesia
American people murdered abroad
American expatriates in Indonesia
19th-century Baptists